Daniel Caltagirone (born 18 June 1972) is an English actor, best known for his roles in The Beach, Lara Croft Tomb Raider: The Cradle of Life, and the Oscar-winning film The Pianist. His breakthrough role came in the television series Lock Stock, where he played series lead Moon. He is father to two children with ex-wife Melanie Sykes.

Early life
Caltagirone was born and brought up in London, where he attended St Ignatius College, Enfield. He spent a considerable amount of time as a child in New York City, where he has relatives.

Acting career
Caltagirone went on to attend the Guildhall School of Music and Drama, graduating in 1997. It was during his last year at Guildhall that he was discovered by an ITV talent scout and cast as a lead in Ruth Rendell's Going Wrong. He finished filming his first film role, Legionnaire, alongside Jean-Claude Van Damme in the summer of 1998.

Shortly after, he spent a season at the Royal Shakespeare Company. Whilst at the RSC he was spotted by director Danny Boyle and cast as Unhygenix in The Beach starring Leonardo Di Caprio Before commencing work on The Beach, he joined the cast of Friends for a role in "The One with Ross's Wedding", shot mostly in London. In 1999, he was cast by Guy Ritchie as one of the leads in Lock Stock, the TV spin off of the film Lock Stock and Two Smoking Barrels.

Caltagirone then starred in Roman Polanski's The Pianist which went on to win an array of international awards, including Academy Awards for Best Actor, Best Director and Best Screen Play.

In 2003 he appeared in Lara Croft: Tomb Raider – The Cradle of Life with Angelina Jolie and Gerard Butler. Shortly after finishing filming on Tomb Raider he was cast in the critically acclaimed movie The Fall. Directed by Tarsem Singh, Caltagirone played the dual roles of Hollywood star Archibald Sinclair and Governor Odious.

In 2006 Caltagirone starred in The Path to 9/11, the controversial two part miniseries which aired in the United States on ABC. The film starring Harvey Keitel and Donnie Wahlberg dramatizes the events leading up to the September 11, 2001 attacks. Caltagirone was cast as one of the CIA operatives who were allegedly sent to kill Osama Bin Laden. In 2009, he played ex-SAS Captain Gideon Stone in The Fixer. He portrayed aristocrat Girolamo de Treviso in The Tudors in 2010. He starred at The Hampstead Theatre in .45, playing alongside fellow Tudors alumna Natalie Dormer in 2011. In 2016, he appeared in the TV series Medici: Masters of Florence.. In 2020 he played Will Arnot in Death in Paradise. 

In September 2021, Caltagirone was honoured with the Nations Award in Venice for Outstanding Contribution to Film.

Filmography

Film

Television

References

External links

 'We have solidarity' Melanie Sykes and ex-husband 'get rid of egos' for autistic son

Living people
1972 births
English male film actors
English male television actors
English film producers
English people of Italian descent
Male actors from London